Akın Altıok (born 13 July 1932) is a Turkish former triple jumper who competed in the 1952 Summer Olympics.

References

1932 births
Living people
Turkish male triple jumpers
Olympic athletes of Turkey
Athletes (track and field) at the 1952 Summer Olympics
Mediterranean Games gold medalists for Turkey
Mediterranean Games medalists in athletics
Athletes (track and field) at the 1951 Mediterranean Games
20th-century Turkish people